Steve Starkey is an American film producer and second unit director who is widely associated with Robert Zemeckis. He served as an assistant film editor for both The Empire Strikes Back (1980) and Return of the Jedi (1983).

Filmography
He was a producer in all films unless otherwise noted.

Film

Second unit director or assistant director

Editorial department

Thanks

Television

References

External links
 

Producers who won the Best Picture Academy Award
Living people
Golden Globe Award-winning producers
American film producers
Year of birth missing (living people)